The Swedish extradition of Baltic soldiers, or simply the Extradition of the Balts, was a controversial political event that took place in January 1946, in the aftermath of World War II when Sweden, a neutral country during the war, extradited to the Soviet Union some 150 Latvian and Estonian soldiers who had been recruited into Waffen-SS by Germany as well as 9 Lithuanian soldiers who had been fighting against the Soviet invasion of the Baltic states during the war. Many of them were subsequently imprisoned and some sentenced to death by the Soviet government.

Background and extradition process
On 2 June 1945, the Soviet Union demanded that Sweden extradite all interned Axis soldiers, as per the terms in the German surrender. The government protocol from 15 June was kept secret until it became public on 19 November. It was supported by most of the Swedish Parliament and the Swedish Communist Party wanted to go further, by extraditing all civilian refugees from Estonia, Latvia, and Lithuania.

The majority of the Baltic soldiers extradited were Latvians (149 out of 167) who had escaped from the Courland Pocket. When they reached Sweden, those in uniform were detained in detention camps. The extradition to the Soviet Union took place on 25 January 1946 in the port of Trelleborg for transportation on the steamer . On return they were briefly put in a camp in Liepāja and later released. According to one source at least 50 of the Latvians were arrested between 1947 and 1954 and were sentenced, often to 10–15 years in prison.

Sweden also extradited about 3,000 German soldiers, according to laws on prisoners of war. The people from the Baltic states were, however, more controversial since the Soviet authorities viewed them as Soviet citizens (the Soviet Union had occupied the independent Baltic states in 1940) and therefore regarded the people from the Baltic states as traitors, and the internees feared death sentences. Two Latvian officers committed suicide.

Of the prisoners, Lieutenant Colonel Kārlis Gailītis and Captain Ernsts Keselis were sentenced to death but had their sentences changed to 17 years hard labour in Gulag camps. Three others of lower ranks were sentenced to death and executed in 1946.

Subsequent events 
In 1970, Johan Bergenstråhle made a film, A Baltic Tragedy, about the subject. The film is based on Per Olov Enquist’s Legionärerna: En roman om baltutlämningen (1968) (English title: The Legionnaires: A Documentary Novel) which had won the Nordic Council's Literature Prize and Enquist collaborated on the script.

On 20 June 1994, 40 of the 44 surviving extradited (35 Latvians, 4 Estonians, and 1 Lithuanian) accepted an invitation to visit Sweden. They were received by King Carl XVI Gustaf of Sweden at the Stockholm Palace. The Swedish Minister of Foreign Affairs Margaretha af Ugglas said that the Swedish government agreed with the criticism of the decision and regretted the injustice, but did not apologize.

A memorial, "stranded refugee ship" (1999–2000) by Christer Bording, has been erected in Trelleborg.

See also 
 Latvian Legion
 Operation Keelhaul
 Repatriation of Cossacks after World War II
 Sweden during World War II
 Western betrayal

References

Further reading 
 Freivalds, O., Alksnis, E. Latviešu kaŗavīru traģēdija Zviedrijā. Copenhagen, Denmark: Imanta, 1956 (254 pp).
 Freivalds, O. De internerade balternas tragedi i Sverige år 1945-1946. Stockholm, Sweden: Daugavas vanagi, 1968 (432 pp). 
 Landsmanis, A. De misstolkade legionärerna. Stockholm, Sweden: The Latvian National Foundation, 1970 (83 pp). (– Corrects Enquist’s The Legionnaires).
 Zalcmanis, J. Baltutlämningen 1946 i dokument. Stockholm, Sweden: Militärhistoriska förlaget, 1983 (96 pp).
 Ekholm, C. Balt- och tyskutlämningen 1945-1946. Uppsala, Sweden: Acta Universitatis Upsaliensis, Studia Historica Upsaliensia 136 (224 pp.), 137 (444 pp.), 1984.
 Ekholm, C. & Schulze, H. Flyktingminnesvård i Trelleborg. Fritt Militärt Forum Nr 1, 2000.
 Silamiķelis, V. With the Baltic Flag. Rīga, Latvia: Jumava, 2002 (316 pp).

Cold War
Military history of Latvia during World War II
Military history of Lithuania during World War II
Military history of Estonia during World War II
Soviet Union–Sweden relations
World War II prisoners of war
Aftermath of World War II in Sweden
Extradition
1945 in international relations
1946 in international relations
1945 in Sweden
1946 in Sweden
People extradited to the Soviet Union
Post–World War II forced migrations
Extradition of Balts
January 1946 events in Europe
Deportation
Occupation of the Baltic states